Henry Robert Albert Kelleher (born 3 March 1929), played first-class cricket for Surrey and Northamptonshire between 1955 and 1958. He was born in Bermondsey, London. He is the uncle of the former Kent cricketer Danny Kelleher.

Kelleher was a right-arm fast-medium bowler with a whippy bowling action and a tail-end left-handed batsman. Having played for the second team since 1952 in the Minor Counties, he made a sensational first-class debut for Surrey at the age of 26 in 1955, taking five Worcestershire wickets for 23 runs in the first innings of the match at The Oval and following that up with five for 50 in the second innings for match figures of 10–73. Wisden Cricketers' Almanack noted that he "made fast-medium deliveries lift on drying turf". He never surpassed either the first innings figures or the match figures. But in the strong Surrey side of the 1950s, Kelleher was unable to retain his place and at the end of the 1955 season he left the county and joined Northamptonshire under special registration.

He immediately went into the Northamptonshire first team and retained his place across the damp summer of 1956, often opening the bowling with the England fast bowler Frank Tyson. Wisden noted that he "did well in a year when pitches were not in the main suited to his medium-fast bowling". In all matches, he took 55 wickets at an average of 28.38. As with his Surrey career, his best day was his first one: in the opening match of the season against Nottinghamshire he took five wickets for 85 (and Tyson took four for 59) in Nottinghsmahire's first innings, and these would be the best innings figures of his Northamptonshire career.

The 1957 season, when Northamptonshire finished as runners-up to Surrey in the County Championship, was the most successful in the county's history, but most of the bowling success was down to Tyson, who took 100 wickets in a season for the first time, and the three slow bowlers, George Tribe, Jack Manning and Michael Allen, who took 305 Championship wickets between them. Kelleher took just 44 wickets in 22 matches and his bowling average, 26.90, contrasted with the county's other bowlers, all of whom averaged less than 20 runs per wicket. In 1958, he played in three early matches, but took only one wicket, and lost his place in the attack to Albert Lightfoot, who supplemented his occasional bowling with useful batting, a skill Kelleher never aspired to. He left Northamptonshire at the end of the 1958 season.

After leaving first class cricket, Kelleher played for many years in league cricket, including a long spell as professional for Old Hill Cricket Club in the Birmingham League.

References

1929 births
Living people
English cricketers
Surrey cricketers
Northamptonshire cricketers